Nicki Whitehouse is a British archaeologist and Environmental Archaeologist. She is a Professor in Archaeological Science at the University of Glasgow.

Education and career

Whitehouse has a bachelor's degree in archaeology from Newcastle University, awarded 1988; a master's degree in Environmental Archaeology and Palaeoeconomy from the University of Sheffield, awarded 1993; and a doctorate from Sheffield, awarded 2000. Her research is focused on human-environment relationships and the interface between the physical sciences and humanities. 

She was Professor of human-environment systems in the School of Geography, Earth and Environmental Sciences at the University of Plymouth before taking up her current role at the University of Glasgow.

Whitehouse is a fellow of the Royal Entomological Society and Fellow of the Society of Antiquaries; she was President of the INQUA Humans and Biosphere Commission (HABCOMM) between 2011-2019.  She is on the editorial board of several major journals, including Quaternary International (since 2011), Journal of Archaeological Science: Reports (since 2015), She was a member of the committee of the Association for Environmental Archaeology from 2013 to 2017, and prior to that its membership secretary.

Research

Whitehouse specialises in the analysis of sub-fossil insects and the integration of this data with other environmental proxies. Her research has covered topics including the inter-relationships between archaeology, environmental and climatic change; changing biodiversity as a consequence of climate change and human impact; and the development of the cultural landscape, particularly during the transition to agriculture. Her research has been funded by the Arts and Humanities Research Council, Natural Environment Research Council, the Heritage Lottery Fund and INSTAR (Irish National Strategic Archaeological Research). She is global co-lead of the LandCover6K project with Prof Kathy Morrisson and Prof Marco Madella. She has collaborated with Meriel McClatchie, Phil Barratt, Rick Schulting, Rowan McLaughlin and Amy Bogaard. She has long standing collaborations with Tony Brown, University of Southampton, including as Co-I on AHRC funded Celtic Crannogs project. 
She was also a co-investigator on a European Research Council project, Fragility and sustainability in restricted island environments: adaptation, cultural change and collapse in prehistory (FRAGSUS), from 2013 to 2018.

Selected publications
Brown, A.G.; Fonville, T.; van Hardenbroek, M.; Cavers, G.; Crone, A.; McCormick, F.; Murray, E.; Mackay, H.; Whitehouse, N.J.; Henderson, A.; Barratt, P.; Davies, K.; Head, K.;  Langdon, P.G.; Alsos, I. & Pirrie, D. 2022. New integrated molecular approaches for understanding lake settlements in NW Europe. Antiquity, 96(389), 1179-1199. doi:10.15184/aqy.2022.70
Slaughter and feasting revealed by DNA and lipids from Celtic Islands (Crannógs). Nature Scientific Reports. https://www.nature.com/articles/s41598-021-91057-x
Brown, A.G.; Edward J. Rhodes, Steve Davis, Yusheng Zhang, Ben Pears, Nicki J. Whitehouse, Chris Bradley, Jenny Bennett, Jean-Luc Schwenninger, Antony Firth, Emma Firth, Paul Hughes, Des Walling. 2021. Late Quaternary evolution of a lowland anastomosing river system: geological-topographic inheritance, non-uniformity and implications for biodiversity and management. Quaternary Science Reviews 15 May 2021, 106929
McClatchie M, Schulting R, McLaughlin R, Colledge S, Bogaard A, Barratt P & Whitehouse N (2022) 'Food Production, Processing and Foodways in Neolithic Ireland' Environmental Archaeology 27(1), 80-92. https://doi.org/10.1080/14614103.2019.1615215
McLaughlin TR, Whitehouse NJ, Schulting RJ, McClatchie M, Barratt P & Bogaard A (2016) 'The Changing Face of Neolithic and Bronze Age Ireland: A Big Data Approach to the Settlement and Burial Records' World Prehistory 29, (2) pp 117–153
Lancelotti C, Zurro D, Whitehouse NJ, Madella M, Kramer K, García-Granero JJ & Greaves R (2016) 'Resilience of small-scale societies’ livelihoods: a framework for studying the transition from food gathering to food production' Ecology and Society 21(4): 8
Whitehouse NJ, Schulting RJ, McClatchie M, Barratt P, McLaughlin TR, Bogaard A, Colledge S, Marchant R, Gaffrey J (2014) 'Neolithic agriculture on the European western frontier: the boom and bust of early farming in Ireland' Journal of Archaeological Science 51, 
Whitehouse N; Roe H; McCarron S; Knight J (ed.)  (2008) North of Ireland; field guide. 
Murphy E; Whitehouse NJ (ed.)  (2007) Environmental Archaeology in Ireland

References 

Living people
Year of birth missing (living people)
British archaeologists
British women archaeologists
Alumni of the University of Sheffield
Alumni of Newcastle University
Academics of the University of Plymouth
Fellows of the Royal Entomological Society